The Oleksy tapes are tapes secretly recorded during a 2006 conversation between Józef Oleksy and Aleksander Gudzowaty. In the recordings, former Left Democratic Alliance (SLD) Prime Minister of Poland Józef Oleksy denounces colleagues, and reveals shady aspects of Polish political life. The recordings were published by Polish media in 2007.

The tapes are one of the factors responsible for the decline in popularity of Polish post-communist parties, especially the SLD.

External links
Oleksy_tapes_could_lead_to_criminal_action

Political scandals in Poland
History of Poland (1989–present)
2006 in Poland
2007 in Poland